Tani Vili (born 31 October 2000) is a French rugby union player, who plays for Bordeaux Bègles. His usual playing position is centre. He was born in France to parents from Wallis and Futuna and New Caledonia.

Biography 
Tani Vili was called by Fabien Galthié to the French national team for the first time in June 2021, for the summer tour of Australia.

References

External link

2000 births
Living people
French rugby union players
ASM Clermont Auvergne players
Rugby union centres
Rugby sevens players at the 2018 Summer Youth Olympics